Empire of Silver (known as Ogedai: Empire of Silver in America) is the fourth book of the Conqueror series, based on the life of Mongol warlord Genghis's son Ogedai  by Conn Iggulden. It focuses mainly on the Mongol attacks on Russia, the problems of succession and the building of Karakorum.

References

2010 British novels
Conqueror (novel series)
Novels set in the 13th century
Novels set in Mongol Empire
HarperCollins books